Plagodis reticulata is a species of moth of the family Geometridae. It is found in south-east Asia, including Bhutan and Taiwan.

The wingspan is about 28 mm.

References

Moths described in 1893
Ourapterygini
Moths of Asia